Aechmea woronowii is a plant species in the genus Aechmea. This species is native to Ecuador, Peru and Colombia.

References

woronowii
Flora of South America
Plants described in 1930